Ardea is a biannual peer-reviewed scientific journal that was established in 1912. It is the official publication of the Netherlands Ornithologists' Union and covers the ecology, life history, and evolution of birds.  It occasionally publishes special issues on conference or workshop proceedings. The journal takes its name from the heron genus Ardea.

See also
Dutch Birding – journal of the Dutch Birding Association
List of birds of the Netherlands
List of journals and magazines relating to birding and ornithology

References

External links

Journals and magazines relating to birding and ornithology
1912 establishments in the Netherlands
Publications established in 1912
Ornithology in the Netherlands
English-language journals